The year 2009 is the 1st year in the history of Tachi Palace Fights, a mixed martial arts promotion based in The United States. In 2009 Tachi Palace Fights held 3 events beginning with, TPF: Best of Both Worlds.

Events list

TPF: Best of Both Worlds

TPF: Best of Both Worlds was an event held on March 5, 2009 at the Tachi Palace in Lemoore, California.

Results

TPF 1: Tachi Palace Fights 1

TPF 1: Tachi Palace Fights 1 was an event held on October 8, 2009 at the Tachi Palace in Lemoore, California.

Results

TPF 2: Brawl in the Hall

TPF 2: Brawl in the Hall was an event held on December 3, 2009 at the Tachi Palace in Lemoore, California.

Results

See also 
 Tachi Palace Fights

References

Tachi Palace Fights events
2009 in mixed martial arts